is a Japanese media franchise of RPGs, novels, anime and manga by Ryo Mizuno and Group SNE. The novels by Mizuno and others were published from 1993 to 2002, based on Mizuno's RPG "replays" serialized in the Japanese magazines Comptiq and later in Dengeki-Oh (Blitz King) from 1989 to 1998.

A full-length Japanese animated motion picture  and a manga illustrated by Akira Himekawa were made in 1995. Radio drama (later re-released as Drama CD) adapting the same story was released earlier in 1993. Video game Legend of Shinou Christania, and tabletop RPG materials were also released. The film has been officially released on VHS and DVD in North America by ADV Films.

The film's sequel, the three-part original video animation  (OVA) series Legend of Crystania: The Chaos Ring, was released in 1996. These episodes were released on VHS and later on DVD (as a single movie) in North America by ADV Films.

Overview
The series takes place in the same fantasy world as Ryo Mizuno other series Record of Lodoss War and Rune Soldier, albeit on a different continent. It focuses on the land which Ashram sailed to after the Lodoss series, a continent called Crystania which is under the rule of the animal gods. Ashram is the king of the people of Marmo, the cursed island in Record of Lodoss War. Most of the plot in Crystania centres on Pirotess's (now called Sheru) quest to free Ashram from Barbas, although many new characters are introduced in the course of the story and the main character of the first series is Prince Redon.

Novels 
The series ran from 1993 to 2002. First several novels were published by Kadokawa Shoten. Later releases were published by MediaWorks, a former division of Kadokawa Shoten. The first four novels were written by Record of Lodoss War author Ryo Mizuno and illustrated by Satoshi Urushihara. Later novels were written mostly by other authors and illustrated by various artists.

Crystania: Legend of the Drifters 1  (漂流伝説クリスタニア1, Hyōryū Densetsu Kurisutania 1) (June 1993)
Crystania: Legend of the Drifters 2  (漂流伝説クリスタニア2, Hyōryū Densetsu Kurisutania 2) (December 1993)
Crystania: Legend of the Drifters 3  (漂流伝説クリスタニア3, Hyōryū Densetsu Kurisutania 3) (December 1994)
Crystania: Legend of the Drifters 4  (漂流伝説クリスタニア4, Hyōryū Densetsu Kurisutania 4) (February 1996)
First Adventure: Legend of Crystania (はじまりの冒険者たちレジェンド・オブ・クリスタニア, Hajimari no Bōkenshatachi Rejendo Obu Kurisutania) (July 1995)
Crystania: Legend of the Gods’ King 1 (神王伝説クリスタニア(上), Shin'ō Densetsu Kurisutania (ue)) (January 1996) 
Crystania: Legend of the Gods’ King 2 (神王伝説クリスタニア(下), Shin'ō densetsu kurisutania (shita)) (June 1996)
Crystania: Legend of Heroes (英雄伝説クリスタニア, Eiyū Densetsu Kurisutania) (November 1997)
Crystania: Legend of the Ant Emperor (蟻帝伝説クリスタニア, Ari-tei Densetsu Kurisutania)  (August 1998)
Crystania: Legend of the Golden (黄金伝説クリスタニア, Kogane Densetsu Kurisutania) (April 1999)
Crystania: Legend of the Seal (封印伝説クリスタニア, Fūin Densetsu Kurisutania) (August 2000)
Crystania: Legend of the Dark (暗黒伝説クリスタニア, Ankoku Densetsu Kurisutania) (December 2000)
Crystania: Legend of Mercenaries: The Battle of the Other World (傭兵伝説クリスタニア 異界の決戦, Yōhei Densetsu Kurisutania Ikai no Kessen) (March 2002)

Short Stories 
Crystalnia: Legend of the Seal (August 1995) (prelude)
Christania: Legend of Mercenaries (April 1997) (prelude)
Crystania: Legend of Mercenaries: Omens of the Dark Clouds (March 2001)
Crystania: Legend of Mercenaries: Visitors from the Past (June 2001)

In 1995 The Black Knight (黒衣の騎士, Kokui no Kishi) was released. Though technically part of the Record of Lodoss War novel series it also has a focus on Crystania as it contains stories of Ashram's leaving Lodoss island and journey to Crystania.

Credits and episodes

Legend of Crystania - The Motion Picture

Music
 Opening Theme: Haruka na Inori (遥かな祈り) by Hitomi Mieno
 Ending Theme: Hikari no Chizu" (光の地図) by Hitomi Mieno

Legend of Crystania: the Chaos Ring OVA

Episodes

Music
Opening Theme: "The Map of Light" by Hitomi Mieno
Ending Theme: "Save My Love" by Satoko Shimonari

English voice cast
 Adam Dudley – Rumiss
 Aimee McCormick – Rio
 Amber Allison – Aderishia
 Amy Bizjak – Jenoba, Pegleg Boy
 Bill Wise – Garudi
 Charles C. Campbell – Rome
 David Jones – Obier
 Gary Dehan – Lizard Captain
 Gray G. Haddock – Cavalry Captain, Grib
 Jason Phelps – Nasare
 Jay Sefton – Redon
 Jessica Schwartz – Raifan
 Joe Hamilton – Kwairde
 John Hoff – Matisse
 Ken Webster – Ashram
 Kevin Remington – Boakes
 Larry Goode – Lizard A, Soldier A, Villager A
 Lauri Raymond – Lady Meira
 Robert Rudie – Lord Haven
 Snowden Henry – Lizard B, Soldier B, Villager B
 Steve Sanders – Muha
 Susan Cotton – Lizard C, Soldier C, Villager C
 Tom Bartling – Lizard D, Soldier D, Villager D
 Tom Byrne – Barbas

References

External links
 
 

1995 anime films
1996 anime OVAs
ADV Films
Record of Lodoss War
Shōnen manga
Films scored by Michiru Ōshima
Films scored by Toshihiko Sahashi